Francis Xavier Seelos, CSsR (January 11, 1819 – October 4, 1867) was a German Redemptorist who worked as a missionary in the United States frontier. Towards the end of his life, he went to New Orleans to minister to victims of yellow fever. He then died after contracting the disease.

Early life
Seelos was born in Füssen in the Kingdom of Bavaria on January 11, 1819, one of 12 children born to Mang Seelos and Franziska Schwarzenbach. He was baptized that same day in the Parish Church of St. Mang. He attended middle school at the Institute of Saint Stephen in Augsburg. Receiving his diploma in 1839, he went on to university in Munich, where he completed his philosophy studies. Having expressed a desire for the priesthood since childhood, he entered the diocesan seminary on September 19, 1842.

Seelos was touched by the letters published in the Catholic newspaper Sion, from the Redemptorist missionaries describing the lack of spiritual care for the thousands of German-speaking immigrants. After visiting the Redemptorists in Altötting, he decided to enter the congregation, asking to work as a missionary in the United States. He was accepted by the Redemptorists on November 22, 1842, and sailed the following year from Le Havre, France, on March 17, arriving in New York on April 20, 1843. On December 22, 1844, after having completed his novitiate and theological studies, Seelos was ordained a priest in the Redemptorist Church of St. James in Baltimore, Maryland.

American missions
After being ordained, Seelos worked for nine years in the Parish of St. Philomena in Pittsburgh, Pennsylvania—first as curate to St. John Neumann, who was the superior of the Redemptorist community, later as Superior himself, and for three years as pastor. During this time, he was also the Redemptorist Novice master. With Neumann, he also dedicated himself to preaching missions. Regarding their relationship, Seelos said: "He has introduced me to the active life" and "he has guided me as a spiritual director and confessor."

Seelos is described as, "...a tall, slender, dignified man, with a kind, open, innocent face." Although born in Bavaria, he spoke English elegantly and fluently.

Seelos's availability and innate kindness in understanding and responding to the faithful's needs quickly made him well known as an expert confessor and spiritual director, so much so that people came to him even from neighboring towns. His confessional was open to all: "I hear confessions in German, English, French, of Whites, and of Blacks." He practiced a simple lifestyle and a simple manner of expressing himself. His preaching themes, rich in Biblical content, were always understood even by the simplest people. Seelos was described as a man with a constant smile and a generous heart, especially towards the needy and the marginalized.

A constant endeavor in this pastoral activity was instructing the little children in the faith. Seelos favored this ministry, but he also held it as fundamental for the growth of the Christian community in the parish. In 1854, he was appointed Pastor of St. Alphonsus Parish simultaneously in Baltimore; Pastor and Prefect of Students at Sts. Peter and Paul Church in Cumberland, Maryland, in 1857; and Pastor and Prefect of Students at St. Mary's Parish in Annapolis (1862). As Prefect of Students, he always remained the kind and happy pastor, always prudently attentive to his students' needs and conscientious of their doctrinal formation. Above all, he strove to instill in these future Redemptorist missionaries the enthusiasm, spirit of sacrifice, and apostolic zeal for the people's spiritual and temporal welfare.

In 1860 Seelos was proposed as a candidate for the office of Bishop of Pittsburgh. Having been excused from this responsibility by Pope Pius IX, from 1863 until 1866, he dedicated himself to the life of an itinerant missionary preaching in English and German in the states of Connecticut, Illinois, Michigan, Missouri, New Jersey, New York, Ohio, Pennsylvania, Rhode Island and Wisconsin.

Seelos notably preached a two-week parish mission at St. Mary of Victories Church in St. Louis, Missouri in October 1865. The Church has a small shrine to his honor, a first-class relic, and one of the five known death masks made of Seelos.

After a year as Curate of St. Mary's Parish in Detroit, Michigan, Seelos was assigned in 1866 as Pastor of the Church of St. Mary of the Assumption, New Orleans. However, his ministry in New Orleans was destined to be brief. In September of that year, exhausted from visiting and caring for victims of yellow fever, he contracted the disease. After several weeks, he died on October 4, 1867, at the age of 48 years and 9 months.

Veneration

Pope John Paul II beatified Seelos in St. Peter's Square on April 9, 2000. In the beatification homily, the pope stated: "Today, Bl. Francis Xavier Seelos invites the members of the Church to deepen their union with Christ in the sacraments of Penance and the Eucharist. Through his intercession, may all who work in the vineyard for the salvation of God's people be encouraged and strengthened in their task."

Seelos is commemorated in the Martyrology on October 5.

The National Shrine of Blessed Francis Xavier Seelos is located in St. Mary's Assumption Church, the first German Catholic Church in New Orleans and Louisiana. The Shrine contains the official portrait of Father Seelos, used in Rome for his beatification, and photographs that depict Father Seelos and his life as a missionary. The centerpiece of the Shrine is a sacred reliquary, which houses the remains of Father Seelos. St. Mary's Church is listed on the National Register of Historic Places

The historic St. Vincent de Paul Catholic Church at 3037 Dauphine Street in New Orleans, Louisiana, was renamed Blessed Francis Xavier Seelos Catholic Church in his honor. Additionally, after two Catholic elementary schools were merged in Wexford, Pennsylvania, the school was renamed in his honor, Blessed Francis Seelos Academy.

Notes

References
 Foley O.F.M., Leonard. Saint of the Day, Lives, Lessons, and Feast, (revised by Pat Mccloskey O.F.M.), Franciscan Media

External links
National Shrine of Blessed Francis Xavier Seelos C.Ss.R.
Church where Blessed Francis Xavier Seelos was baptized
American Wonderworker, The Life and Miracles of Blessed Francis Xavier Seelos by Brother André Marie, M.I.C.M., Saint Benedict Center

1819 births
1867 deaths
People from Füssen
German emigrants to the United States
19th-century German Roman Catholic priests
German Roman Catholic missionaries
19th-century American Roman Catholic priests
Infectious disease deaths in Louisiana
Deaths from yellow fever
German beatified people
American beatified people
Beatified Redemptorists
19th-century venerated Christians
Beatifications by Pope John Paul II
Venerated Catholics by Pope John Paul II
Roman Catholic missionaries in the United States